Kie Kahara (1968) is an Odia film directed by Nitai Palit. The film reflects the socio-economic conflicts of the declining Zamindar families, which were struggling to keep up social status with great difficulty.

Synopsis
Prakash's father leaves him after his wife's death and gives Prakash's custody to his sister Mamata. Mamata gives a good education to Prakash and he becomes an engineer. Prakash gets a job in town, In the town, he meets Rajendra Samantrai's family and stays in their home as tenant. Rajendra Samantrai's forefathers are Zamindars. Rajendra struggles enough to fulfill the  demands of his wife and her status. in the meanwhile, Rajendra's daughter Malati falls in love with Prakash. Rajendra accepts their love, but Subhadra prefers Nagen, who is the son of a wealthy contractor Nabin Mahapatra over Prakash. Subhadra believes Nagen's wealth can help them maintain their status. When Nagen comes with an offer for his marriage with Malati, Rajendra flatly denies this. The offended Nagen tries to disrupt Rajendra's family. Also Nagen successfully creates confusion between Prakash and Malati. Prakash's father arrives the scene and ends all confusion. At last Prakash and Malati get married.

Cast
 Sarat Pujari - Parakash
 Saudamini Misra - Malati
 Samuel Sahu - Rajendra Samantrai
 Lila Dulali - Subhadra
 Dhira Biswal - Nagen Mahapatra
 Ramchandra Pratihari - 	Nabin Mahapatra
 Bhanumati Devi - Mamata
 Sagar Das -Ashok
 Shyamalendu Bhattacharjee	- Servant
 Niranjan Satapathy - Kartik
 Narendra Behera - Prakash's friend
 Bimal Choudhury - Prakash's father	
 Geetarani
 Saraswati
 Pira Misra
 Bhim Singh

Soundtrack
The music for the film was composed by Akshaya Mohanty.

Box office
The film created a sensation and ran to packed houses for about five months in Cuttack city only. It was the first Oriya film to run more than 100 days at several theaters. The film became a box office hit.

References

External links

1968 films
Indian drama films
1968 drama films
1960s Odia-language films